Charles Wesley Leffingwell (December 5, 1840 – October 10, 1928) was an American author, educator, and Episcopal priest.

Biography 
Charles Wesley Leffingwell was born in Ellington, Connecticut. He was a descendant of Thomas Leffingwell, known as one of the founders of Norwich, Connecticut. He studied at Union College in Schenectady, New York, and Knox College in Galesburg, Illinois, where he was a member of Beta Theta Pi. He later studied at Nashotah House Theological Seminary before ordination to the diaconate (1867) and priesthood (1868). In 1868, he founded St. Mary's School in Knoxville at the invitation of Henry John Whitehouse, and in 1890 he founded St Alban's School for Boys in the same city.

Leffingwell was editor of The Living Church magazine from 1880 to 1900.

From 1906 he was President of the Leffingwell Rancho in Whittier, California, the land for which he had acquired earlier. His son Charles Warring Leffingwell (sometimes written as Charles W. Leffingwell Jr.) was responsible for the active management of the ranch, which produced  fruits and nuts.  

His other son, Ernest de Koven Leffingwell was an arctic explorer and geologist.  Leffingwell provided partial financial support for his son's explorations.

Leffingwell moved to Pasadena, California (of which Herringshaw's lists him as a founder) in 1908. He died there on October 10, 1928.

Leffingwell Road, which goes through South Whittier, East Whittier, and Whittier, was named after him. Another small segment of Leffingwell goes through the city of Norwalk.

Published works 
 Reading Book of English Classics for Young Pupils (New York: Putnam, 1888)
 Lyrics of The Living Church (Chicago: A. C. McClurg and Company, 1891)
 The Laughing and Sorrowful Rain, and Other Poems (Privately printed, 1899)
 A Book of Prayers, together with Psalms and Hymns and Spiritual Songs, Ancient and Modern (Milwaukee: 1922)
 Early Days at St. Mary’s, Knoxville, Illinois (Milwaukee: Morehouse Publishing, 1926)
  The Leffingwell Record: A genealogy of the descendants of Lieut. Thomas Leffingwell Pequot Press, Chester, Connecticut 1897
 References 
Perry, Albert James. History of Knox County, Illinois: Its Cities, Towns and People, S.J. Clarke Publishing Company, 1912. Volume 2 p 1133
Brown, John Howard. The Cyclopaedia of American Biography: Comprising the Men and Women of the United States Who Have Been Identified with the Growth of the Nation Republished by Kessinger Publishing 2006 without identification of the original.  Volume 5 p31. (Worldcat shows only one edition under this title with volume 5 published 1903)
Herringshaw, Thomas William. Herringshaw's American blue-book of biography.'' American Publishers' Association, 1914, p602

References

External links 
 Southern California Days of Lemons, Roses and a Shopping Mall history and further development of the Leffingwell Ranch.
 Charles W. Leffingwell Bunkhouse Greene & Greene virtual Archives.
 St. Mary's and St. Albans schools in historic pictures
 

1840 births
1928 deaths
19th-century American Episcopalians
Knox College (Illinois) alumni
People from Ellington, Connecticut
People from Knoxville, Illinois
Nashotah House alumni
Union College (New York) alumni